Ali Ferydoon (born 1 January 1992) is a Kuwait-born Iranian footballer who is a forward. He scored 19 goals for Al Shamal in the 2013–14 season and was Qatari 2nd Division's top scorer.

References

External links
 

1992 births
Living people
Iranian footballers
Expatriate footballers in Qatar
Iranian expatriate footballers
Sportspeople from Kuwait City
Al-Shamal SC players
Al Ahli SC (Doha) players
Al Sadd SC players
Al-Shahania SC players
Al-Rayyan SC players
Umm Salal SC players
Qatar Stars League players
Qatari Second Division players
Association football forwards
Kuwait Premier League players
Expatriate footballers in Kuwait
Al-Arabi SC (Kuwait) players
Iranian expatriate sportspeople in Kuwait